Philosophy of linguistics is the philosophy of science applied to linguistics. Then it is differentiated from the philosophy of language which deals with matters of meaning and reference.
Philosophy of linguistics is concerned with topics such as what the subject matter and theoretical goals of linguistics are, what form theories in linguistics should take, and what counts as data in linguistic research.

References

External links

 
Linguistics